Akora Khattak (Urdu: اکوڑہ خٹک ) or Sarai Akora is a town in Jehangira tehsil of Nowshera District in the Khyber Pakhtunkhwa province of Pakistan. It sits beside the Kabul River, which merges with the Indus River about 15 kilometres downstream. Neighbouring places are Nowshera Cantonment to the west and Jahangira town to the east.

Review and history 
Akora Khattak is about 14 km (9 miles) east of Nowshera city in Nowshera District on Grand Trunk Road. Akora Khattak was formerly called Sarai Akora, and is named after Malik Akor Khan Khattak, who was the great-grandfather of the famous Pashtun warrior and poet, Khushal Khan Khattak.

Sher Shah Suri period 
The emperor Sher Shah Suri's army dug two wells here and made it a rest place named Sarai Malik Pura. Trade caravans came from Central Asia and stayed here.

Mughal period 
In 1581 Mughal emperor Jalal-ud-din Muhammad Akbar came to Peshawar to end the mutiny of his brother Mirza Hakeem and stayed there for a few years. During this stay, he met (jarga) with all the tribal chiefs for the betterment of the area. In the meeting the name of Malik Akor Khan often came up. It was reported to the emperor that Malik Akor Khan was a chieftain and often robbed the troops on the highway. He lived at Neelab (Nizampur) and continually created problems for the Mughal government. The emperor Jalal-ud-din Mohammad Akbar decided to resolve this problem by making Malik Akor Khan an ally and charged him with the responsibility of collecting tolls from the caravans on the crossing of the Indus at Attock. Malik Akor Khan came to the Sarai Malik Pura (Akora Khattak) for this purpose and made this area his living place. In time this place was renamed as Sarai Akora which later became "Akora Khattak".

Sikh period 
In 1820 Sikhs of Panjab conquered Peshawar and other Pashtun areas and ruled it up to 1849. In 1826 the Mujahidin-I-Islam (Sayed Ahmad Barelvi) fought a battle against Sikhs at this place. In 1834 Sardar lehna Singh built the fort of Akora Khattak near the river Kabul.

British period 
The British period starts from 29 August 1849. In 1809 the colonial Indian administrator, and later Governor of Bombay, Mountstuart Elphinstone visited Peshawar.

The cantonment of Akora Khattak was established in 1850 and on 23 March 1851 Lord Dalhousie, Governor-General of India, visited the place.

In 1916 the first police station was established.

Population 
The population of Akora Khattak, according to 2017 consensus, is 47,255 [1]. The population of Akora Khattak, according to official consensus, over the years is shown in the table below.

Historical places 

Akora Khattak has many historical places. The most famous are Tomb of Khushal Khan Khattak, Shrine of Akhund Adyan Baba Seljoki, Darul Uloom Haqqania, Khushal Khan Khattak Memorial Library and museum.

Tomb of Khushal Khan Khattak  
Akora Khattak is the birthplace and burial place of the poet great Pashto poet and warrior Khushal Khan Khattak. The mausoleum of Khushal Khan was built in 1949.

Shrine of Akhund Adyan Baba Seljoki
The Shrine of Great Turki Sufi Master and aalim Qutb e Aalam Sheikh Akhund Adyan (شیخ اخوند ادین سلجوقی قطب عالم) is situated near Kabul River. The road in front of the shrine traces back to the Sher Shah Suri regime; the road is called Shahi laar (شاہی لار) or royal road. Starting from civil hospital to military camp. The descendants of Sheik Akhund Adyan Baba Seljuki are living in Ziarat kaka Sahib and called Qazyan or Qazi. Sheikh Akhund Adyan Baba died in 1074 AH. Sheikh was teacher of Kaka Sahib. Outside the tomb of Akhun Adyan baba the grave of Shahbaz Khan Khattak (father of Khushal Khan Khattak) is lying. Due to his religious sacrifices of that time Mughal government built his fort like area for his shrine which was reconstructed by Khan Sahib Nur Ahmed Khan in the early 20th century.

Dar-ul-Uloom Haqqania

Darul Uloom-e-haqqania was founded by Maulana Abdul Haq (father of Maulana Sami Ul Haq) along with his companion Haji Mohammad Yousaf in 1947. It is the second largest Islamic religious seminary in Pakistan. More than 8000 students have been educated there.

Khushal Khan Khattak memorial library 
Akora Khan also has Khushal Khan Khattak Memorial Library and a small museum. Library was established in 1994 in the memory of Khushal Khan Khattak. The museum has many medieval era artefacts, some of which were used by Khushal Khan Khattak.

Rang Mahal 

Rang mahal (رنگ محل ) of Mughal era situated near meera akora Khattak.

Education

Schools and colleges
 Govt Centennial Model high school (boys)
 Khyber Model College and School Akora Khattak Campus
 The student model high school and College
 Govt high school (boys) Baghbanpura
 Govt Girls Middle School Baghbanpura
 Sir Syed public High school 
 Govt high school (girls)
 Haqqania High School
 Tamir-e-millat high school
 Public collegiate high school
 Bright Start English school 
 Jamia Shams Ul Madaris Surya Khel for (boys and girls)
 Rahman public school
 Army Public school Akora Khattak
 The Sun Rise public school
 Govt Khushal Khan Khattak degree college (boys)
 Govt Khushal Khan Khattak college (girls)
 The Safah public school
 The Quaid Public School
 The Suffa Public School
 The Sarhad Public School Akora Khattak
 AIMS (Alqalam Islamic Model School)
 ummah higher secondary school soria khel akora khattak

Academies
Umma Children Academy
 National Children Academy
 Scientific Learning tuition Academy Akora khattak
 The Aryana English Language & Computer Academy
 Jamal Ul Quran Online Academy

Institutes
 Shahcom Institute of Technology (Regd.)
 National Institute of Technology

Health care
 Civil Hospital: The government hospital is the main health facility.
 Al-Shifa Homeopathic Clinic: Dr. Muhammad Ali has been a homeopathic practitioner in Akora Khattak for many years.
 LRBT Free Eye Hospital.

Sports

Popular sports for youth are cricket, volleyball and bodybuilding, although there are few facilities available for their use. Paragliding was done in Akora Khattak in the 2010s.

People from Akora Khattak

 Khushal Khan Khattak – warrior poet, chief, and freedom fighter
 Maulana Abdul Haq – Islamic scholar and founder of the Islamic seminary Darul Uloom Haqqania
 Ajmal Khattak – politician and writer

See also

Qazi Hussain Ahmad
Syed Ahmad Barelvi
Kakazai

References

Populated places in Nowshera District